Arun Balkrishna Kolatkar (Marathi: अरुण बालकृष्ण कोलटकर) (1 November 1932 – 25 September 2004) was an Indian poet who wrote in both Marathi and English. His poems found humour in everyday matters. Kolatkar is the only Indian poet other than Kabir to be featured on the World Classics titles of New York Review of Books.

His first collection of English poetry, Jejuri won the Commonwealth Poetry Prize in 1977. His Marathi verse collection Bhijki Vahi won a Sahitya Akademi Award in 2005. An anthology of his works, Collected Poems in English, edited by Arvind Krishna Mehrotra, was published in Britain by Bloodaxe Books in 2010. Trained as an artist from the J. J. School of Art, he was also a noted graphics designer.

Life
Kolatkar was born in Kolhapur, Maharashtra, where his father Tatya Kolatkar was an officer in the Education department. He lived in a traditional patriarchal Hindu extended family, along with his uncle's family. He has described their nine-room house as "a house of cards. Five in a row on the ground, topped by three on the first, and one on the second floor.". The floors had to be "plastered with cowdung every week".

He attended Rajaram High School in Kolhapur, where Marathi was the medium of instruction. After graduation in 1949, much against his father's wishes, he joined S. B. College of Arts, Gulbarga, where his childhood friend Baburao Sadwelkar was enrolled. His college years saw a "mysterious phase of drifting and formal as well as spiritual education", and he graduated in 1957.

In 1953, he married Darshan Chhabda (sister of well-known painter Bal Chhabda). The marriage was opposed by both families, partly because Kolatkar was yet to sell any of his paintings.

His early years in Mumbai were poor but eventful, especially his life as an upcoming artist in the Rampart Row neighborhood, where the Artists' Aid Fund Centre was located. Around this time, he also 
translated Tukaram into English. 

This period of struggle and transition has been captured in his Marathi poem 'The 
Turnaround':

Bombay made me a beggar.
Kalyan gave me a lump of jaggery to suck.
In a small village that had a waterfall
but no name
my blanket found a buyer
and I feasted on plain ordinary water.
 
I arrived in Nasik with
peepul leaves between my teeth.
There I sold my Tukaram
to buy some bread and mince. (translation by Kolatkar)

After many years of struggle, he started work as an art director and graphic designer in several advertising agencies like Lintas.  By the mid-60s he was established as a graphic artist, and joined an eclectic group of creatives headed by 
the legendary advertising professional Kersy Katrak.  It was Katrak, himself a poet, who pushed Kolatkar into bringing out Jejuri. Kolatkar was, in advertising jargon, a 'visualizer'; and soon became one of Mumbai's most successful art directors.  He won the prestigious CAG award for advertising six times, and was admitted to the CAG Hall of Fame.

By 1966, his marriage with Darshan was in trouble, and Kolatkar developed a drinking problem.  This faded after the marriage was dissolved by mutual agreement and he married his second wife, Soonu.

Marathi Poetry and influence

His Marathi poems of the 1950s and 1960s are written
"in the Bombay argot of the migrant working classes and the underworld, part
Hindi, part Marathi, which the Hindi film industry would make proper use of
only decades later". For instance, consider the following, which intersperses Hindi dialect into the Marathi: 

To match this in his English translation, he sometimes adopts "a cowboy variety": 

In Marathi, his poetry is the quintessence of the modernist as manifested in the 'little magazine movement' in the 1950s and 1960s. His early Marathi poetry was radically experimental and displayed the influences of European avant-garde trends like surrealism, expressionism and Beat generation poetry. These poems are oblique, whimsical and at the same time dark, sinister, and exceedingly funny.  Some of these characteristics can be seen in Jejuri and Kala Ghoda Poems in English, but his early Marathi poems are far more radical, dark and humorous than his English poems. His early Marathi poetry is far more audacious and takes greater liberties with language. However, in his later Marathi poetry, the language is more accessible and less radical compared to earlier works. His later works Chirimiri, Bhijki Vahi and Droan are less introverted and less nightmarish. They show a greater social awareness and his satire becomes more direct.  Bilingual poet and anthologist Vilas Sarang assigns great importance to Kolatkar's contribution to Marathi poetry, pointing to Chirimiri in particular as "a work that must give inspiration and
direction to all future Marathi poets".

He won the Kusumagraj Puraskar given by the Marathwada Sahitya Parishad in 1991 and Bahinabai Puraskar given by Bahinabai Prathistan in 1995. 
His Marathi poetry collections include:
 Arun Kolatkarcha Kavita (1977)
 Chirimiri (2004)
 Bhijki Vahi (2004) (Sahitya Akademi award, 2005)
 Droan (2004)

Kolatkar was among a group of post-independence bilingual poets who fused the diction of their mother tongues along with international styles to break new ground in their poetic traditions; others in this group included Gopalakrishna Adiga
(Kannada), Raghuvir Sahay (Hindi), Dilip Chitre (also Marathi), Sunil Gangopadhyay, Malay Roy Choudhury (Bengali), etc.

Influences
Marathi devotional poetry and popular theater (tamasha) had early influences on Kolatkar. American beat poetry, especially of William Carlos Williams were later influences. Along with friends like Dilip Chitre, he was caught up in the modern shift in Marathi poetry which was pioneered by B. S. Mardhekar.

When asked by an interviewer who his favorite poets and writers were, he set out a large multilingual list. While the answer is part rebuff, the list is indicative of the wide, fragmented sources he may have mined, and is worth quoting in full: 
Whitman, Mardhekar, Manmohan, Eliot, Pound, Auden, Hart Crane, Dylan Thomas, Kafka, Baudelaire, Heine, Catullus, Villon, Jynaneshwar, Namdev, Janabai, Eknath, Tukaram, Wang Wei, Tu Fu, Han Shan, C, Honaji, Mandelstam, Dostoevsky, Gogol, Isaac Bashevis Singer, Babel, Apollinaire, Breton, Brecht, Neruda, Ginsberg, Barth, Duras, Joseph Heller ... Gunter Grass, Norman Mailer, Henry Miller, Nabokov, Namdeo Dhasal, Patthe Bapurav, Rabelais, Apuleius, Rex Stout, Agatha Christie, Robert Shakley, Harlan Ellison, Balchandra Nemade, Durrenmatt, Aarp, Cummings, Lewis Carroll, John Lennon, Bob Dylan, Sylvia Plath, Ted Hughes, Godse Bhatji, Morgenstern, Chakradhar, Gerard Manley Hopkins, Balwantbuva, Kierkegaard, Lenny Bruce, Bahinabai Chaudhari, Kabir, Robert Johnson, Muddy Waters, Leadbelly, Howling Wolf, Jon Lee Hooker, Leiber and Stoller, Larry Williams, Lightning Hopkins,Andre Vajda, Kurosawa, Eisenstein, Truffaut, Woody Guthrie, Laurel and Hardy."

English poetry
Kolatkar was hesitant about bringing out his English verse, but his very first book, Jejuri, had a wide impact among fellow poets and littérateurs like Nissim Ezekiel and Salman Rushdie.  Brought out from a small press, it was reprinted twice in quick succession, and Pritish Nandy was quick to anthologize him in the cult collection, Strangertime. For some years, some of his poems were also included in school texts.

The poem sequence deals with a visit to Jejuri, a pilgrimage site for the local Maharashtrian deity Khandoba (a local deity, also an incarnation of Shiva).  In a conversation with poet Eunice de Souza, Kolatkar says he discovered Jejuri in 'a book on temples and legends of Maharashtra... there was a chapter on Jejuri in it. It seemed an interesting place'. Along with his brother and a friend, he visited Jejuri in 1963, and appears to have composed some poems shortly thereafter. 
A version of the poem A low temple was published soon in a little magazine called Dionysius, but both the original manuscript and this magazine were lost. Subsequently, the poems were recreated in the 1970s, and were published in a literary quarterly in 1974, and the book came out in 1976.

The poems evoke a series of images to highlight the ambiguities in modern-day life.  Although situated in a religious setting, they are not religious; in 1978, an interviewer asked him if he believed in God, and Kolatkar said: 'I leave the question alone. I don't think I have to take a position about God one way or the other.'

Before Jejuri, Kolatkar had also published other poem sequences, including the boatride, which appeared in the little magazine, damn you: a magazine of the arts in 1968, and was anthologized twice. A few of his early poems in English also appeared in Dilip Chitre's Anthology of Marathi poetry 1945-1965 (1967). Although some of these poems claim to be an 'English version by poet', "their Marathi originals were never committed to paper." (this is also true of some other bilingual poets like Vilas Sarang.

Later work
A reclusive figure all his life, he lived without a telephone, and was hesitant about bringing out his work.  It was only after he was diagnosed with cancer that two volumes were brought out by friends – the English poetry volumes Kala Ghoda Poems and Sarpasatra (2004).

Sarpa Satra is an 'English version' of a poem with a similar name in Bhijki Vahi. It is a typical Kolatkar narrative poem like Droan, mixing myth, allegory, and contemporary history. Although Kolatkar was never known as a social commentator, his narrative poems tend to offer a whimsical tilted commentary on social mores. Many poems in Bhijki Vahi refer to contemporary history.  However, these are not politicians' comments but a poet's, and he avoids the typical Dalit -Leftist-Feminist rhetoric.

While Jejuri was about the agonized relationship of a modern sensitive individual with the indigenous culture, the Kala Ghoda poems are about the dark underside of Mumbai's underbelly. The bewilderingly heterogeneous megapolis is envisioned in various oblique and whimsical perspectives of an underdog. Like Jejuri, Kala Ghoda is also 'a place poem' exploring the myth, history, geography, and ethos of the place in a typical Kolatkaresque style. While Jejuri, a very popular place for pilgrimage to a pastoral god, could never become Kolatkar's home, Kala Ghoda is about exploring the baffling complexities of the great metropolis. While Jejuri can be considered as an example of searching for a belonging, which happens to be the major fixation of the previous generation of Indian poets in English, Kala Ghoda poems do not betray any anxieties and agonies of 'belonging'. With Kala Ghoda Poems, Indian poetry in English seems to have grown up, shedding adolescent 'identity crises' and goose pimples. The remarkable maturity of poetic vision embodied in the Kala Ghoda Poems makes it something of a milestone in Indian poetry in English.

After his death, a new edition of the hard to obtain Jejuri was published in the New York Review Books Classics series with an introduction by Amit Chaudhuri (2006). Near his death, he had also requested Arvind Krishna Mehrotra to edit some of his uncollected poems. These were published as The Boatride and Other Poems by Pras Prakashan in 2008. His Collected Poems in English, edited by Arvind Krishna Mehrotra, was published in Britain by Bloodaxe Books in 2010.

He was survived by his wife Soonu Kolatkar.

Appearances in the following poetry Anthologies
 The Golden Treasure of Writers Workshop Poetry (2008) ed. by Rubana Huq and published by Writers Workshop, Calcutta
 Ten Twentieth-Century Indian Poets (1976) ed. by R. Parthasarathy and published by Oxford University Press, New Delhi
 The Oxford India Anthology of Twelve Modern Indian Poets (1992) ed. by Arvind Krishna Mehrotra and published by Oxford University Press, New Delhi
 Strangertime: An Anthology of Indian Poetry in English (1977) ed. by Pritish Nandy and published by Hind Pocket Books, New Delhi

Further reading
 Chaudhuri, Amit. Estranging India. New Left Review, Vol. 40 (July/August), 111–126, 2006.
 Pankti Desai, Arun Kolatkar's Sarpa Satra as an Allegory of Extremism .
 A Third Way of Reading Kolatkar Sachin Ketkar
 Wagh, Saleel. Arun Kolatkar : Marathi Kavitecha Bhishma, Blog Pahila. Time & Space Communications. 2007.
 Wagh, Saleel. Arun Kolatkaranchya Teen Kavita : (Three Poems of Arun Kolatkar), Blog Pahila. Time & Space Communications. 2007.
 Wagh, Saleel. Arun Kolatkaranchi Manavsankalpana : (Arun Kolatkar's Concept of Man), Navakshardarshan. Savantvadi, Maharasjtra 2013.
 Zecchini, laetitia. Moving Lines, The celebration of impropriety and the renewal of the world in Arun Kolatkar's poetry. 
 Zecchini, Laetitia. Dharma reconsidered: the inappropriate poetry of Arun Kolatkar in Sarpa Satra, in Diana Dimitrova ed. Religion in Literature and Film in South Asia, New York : Palgrave Macmillan, 2010.

See also

 Indian English Literature
 Indian Writing in English

References

Sources

External links
 

Indian male poets
English-language poets from India
Marathi-language writers
20th-century Indian translators
Marathi-language poets
1932 births
2004 deaths
Recipients of the Sahitya Akademi Award in Marathi
Sir Jamsetjee Jeejebhoy School of Art alumni
20th-century Indian poets
Poets from Maharashtra
20th-century Indian male writers